Chan Yih-shin (born 20 April 1977) is a Taiwanese professional golfer.

Chan turned professional in 2002 and played on the Asian Tour from 2003–04 and since 2008. He won his first Asian Tour event at the inaugural King's Cup in December 2009.

Professional wins (2)

Asian Tour wins (2)

Asian Tour playoff record (1–0)

Results in World Golf Championships

"T" = Tied

Team appearances
Amateur
Eisenhower Trophy (representing Taiwan): 1998
Bonallack Trophy (representing Asia/Pacific): 2000

External links

Taiwanese male golfers
Asian Tour golfers
Asian Games medalists in golf
Golfers at the 1998 Asian Games
Medalists at the 1998 Asian Games
Asian Games bronze medalists for Chinese Taipei
Sportspeople from Taichung
1977 births
Living people